Viktor Sotnikov may refer to:
 Viktor Sotnikov (athlete)
 Viktor Sotnikov (serial killer)